Haymenn Bah-Traoré (born 12 June 1997) is a German professional footballer who plays as a defender for Finnish Veikkausliiga club Haka.

Club career
Bah-Traoré is a former youth academy player of Rot-Weiss Essen. He started his senior career with SG Wattenscheid 09 in July 2016. He moved to Borussia Dortmund's reserve team following season. He made his professional debut for the team on 13 August 2021 in a 5–2 league win against SC Freiburg II.

After spending six months as a free agent, Bah-Traoré joined Finnish club Haka in December 2022.

International career
In September 2021, Bah-Traoré received his first call-up to the Togo national team for FIFA World Cup qualifying matches against Congo.

Personal life
Born in Germany, Bah-Traoré is of Togolese descent.

Honours
Borussia Dortmund II
 Regionalliga West: 2020–21

References

External links
 
 
 BVB profile

1997 births
Living people
German people of Togolese descent
Footballers from Essen
Association football defenders
German footballers
3. Liga players
Regionalliga players
SG Wattenscheid 09 players
Borussia Dortmund II players
FC Haka players